Paul Tomalin is a British television screenwriter.

Career 
Tomalin served as story editor on Shameless in 2009 on the sixth series, as well as wrote an episode. He wrote the Torchwood episode They Keep Killing Suzie (2006), with Dan McCulloch. With Abbott, he contributed to police procedural drama No Offence, and then wrote for the second series of the period crime drama series The Frankenstein Chronicles designed as a re-imagining of Mary Shelley's 1818 novel Frankenstein.

References

External links 

Living people
Year of birth missing (living people)
British television writers
British male screenwriters
British science fiction writers
British male television writers